Mehdi Bennouna was a Moroccan nationalist, writer and journalist. He was the founder of the Maghreb Arab Press Agency in 1959.

Early life 
He was born in Tetouan (Morocco) and died in Rabat. Bennouna left Morocco for Nablus in Palestine at age eleven, without his parents, and began high school in 1929 at the Najah School.

After a year in Morocco in 1936, he traveled in 1937 to Cairo, first to begin medical studies that he did not pursue, then to obtain a degree in journalism in 1941.

Career 
He worked at the newspaper Al Ahram until he could return to Morocco at the end of the Second World War in 1944. In 1937, he participated in the constitution of the Almagreb Al Aqsa Defense Committee.

In 1944, he became a teacher at the Free Institute of Tetouan. He participated in the founding of the Workers' Union affiliated to the Party of National Reform (PRN). He was elected to its Central Committee.

In Tetouan in 1953, he directed the newspaper Al Oumma, organ of the PRN. Upon independence in 1956 he joined the Press Service of the Royal Cabinet of Mohammed V, including the preparation of the President's trip to New York in 1957. He launched Maghreb Arab Press (MAP) in 1959, a private agency that continued until 1975. It was nationalized in 1973. Between 1958 and 1962, he assisted in the creation of Tunisian (TAP), Libyan (JANA), Senegalese (APS), Malian (APA) and Algerian (APS) press agencies, and supervised the launch of the French news agency. (AIIC) of the Organization of the Islamic Conference in 1973-74.

Publications 
He authored books, the first of which was Our Morocco, The story of a just cause, was clandestinely published in Morocco in 1951 and the last was Morocco ... the critical years was published in 1989.

Personal life 
He married Khadija Slaoui on the 29th. They had four children.

He died in Rabat on March 23, 2010 and was buried in his hometown of Tetouan.

See also 
 Maghreb Arabe Presse

References

Moroccan male journalists
Moroccan nationalists
Year of birth missing
2010 deaths